Chenar Bon (also Romanized as Chenār Bon; also known as Chenār Bon-e Zārem Rūd) is a village in Zarem Rud Rural District, Hezarjarib District, Neka County, Mazandaran Province, Iran. At the 2006 census, its population was 342, in 89 families.

References 

Populated places in Neka County